JJ Bunny is a former Nollywood US actor residing in the United States. She is a recording artist and a filmmaker who acted in her first feature film entitled "Caged" in 2009.
She has successfully trescend into the Nollywood and Gollywood film industry.

Filmography

Awards 
 2010 NIGERIA FASHION AND BEAUTY AWARD 2010
 2011 NOLLYWOOD USA ACHIEVEMENT AWARD 2011

References

External links
 
 

Nigerian film directors
Nigerian screenwriters
Living people
21st-century Nigerian actresses
Year of birth missing (living people)